Raven Halfmoon (b. 1991) is a painter and sculptor from the Caddo Nation known for oversize clay-based sculptures. 

A member of the Caddo Nation, Halfmoon grew up in Binger and Norman, Oklahoma. She was introduced to working with clay at the age of thirteen and was influenced by Caddo artist Jeri Redcorn. She studied at the University of Arkansas, graduating a with a double Bachelor’s Degree in cultural anthropology and ceramics and painting. Halfmoon completed two-year residency at the Archie Bray Foundation for the Ceramic Arts in 2021. 

Halfmoon's first solo exhibit, Okla Homma to Manahatta, debuted in 2021 at Ross+Kramer in New York City. It was developed during her Bray Foundation residency. The title of the show combined the Choctaw phrase for the Codo Nation with the Lenape word for Manhattan. The collection consisted of ten large-scale pieces, some weighing upwards of 450 pounds and standing 6 feet tall.

Exhibitions
 Ancestors - Newmark Gallery (2022)
 HASINAI (Caddo) : Our People - Tinworks Art (2021)
 Okla Homma to Manahatta - Ross+Kramer (2021) 
 The New Native - Nino Mier Gallery (2019)

References

Living people
1991 births
Artists from Oklahoma
People from Norman, Oklahoma
Caddo
Women sculptors
21st-century American women
21st-century Native American women
21st-century Native Americans
University of Arkansas alumni